The Commander of the Belgian Navy is the head of the Naval operations and the administrative head in the Belgian Navy, and is under the Chief of Defence. The current commander is Jan De Beurme.

List of officeholders

1831–1862

1939–present

References 

Navy chiefs of staff
Military of Belgium